Saiful Alam (born 28 October 1968) is a Bangladeshi sport shooter. He competed in the 10 m air rifle event at the 1996 Summer Olympics, Alam scored 581 points and finished in 33rd position.

References

External links
 

1968 births
Living people
ISSF rifle shooters
Bangladeshi male sport shooters
Olympic shooters of Bangladesh
Shooters at the 1996 Summer Olympics